Bishop Naum of Strumica (born Zvonko Ilievski) is the Metropolitan of the Diocese of Strumica, Macedonian Orthodox Church – Ohrid Archbishopric.

Life and ministry in the Church 

Metropolitan Naum of Strumica was born on 13 December 1961 in Skopje. The Holy Monastery of Gregoriou on Mount Athos was the place where he started his monastic struggle in May 1987. There he was invested with the Great Schema in 1991 by Archimandrite George Kapsanis, Abbot of the Monastery Gregoriou. Three years later, in 1993, Metropolitan Alexios of Trikke of the Greek Orthodox Church ordained him into deaconate. On August 15, 1995, Bishop Calinic of Arges and Muscel of the Romanian Orthodox Church ordained him a priest. His consecration as Bishop of the Macedonian Orthodox Church took place on August 27, 1995. The following day, August 28, the Holy Synod of Hierarchs of the Macedonian Orthodox Church enthroned him Bishop of the Strumica Diocese as Metropolitan of Strumica.

Education 
Metropolitan Naum graduated in Law at the “Ss. Cyril and Methodius” University, in Skopje, and also graduated in Theology at the “St. Clement of Ohrid” University, in Skopje. In 2008 he defended his PhD thesis at the Faculty of Theology at the “Saint Clement of Ohrid” University, in Sofia, Bulgaria, on the topic “Hesychasm in Athonite Monasticism of the 20th Century.” In 2015 he obtained a master's degree in clinical psychology at the International Slavic University “Gavrilo Romanovich Derzhavin”, in Sveti Nikole. In 2010, he was appointed as an associate professor at the Faculty of Pedagogy at the “St. Clement of Ohrid” State University, in Bitola. Now, he is an associate professor at the International Slavic University “G. R. Derzhavin” in Sveti Nikole, Republic of North Macedonia. He is participating in the higher educational activity of the Faculty of Theology “St. Clement of Ohrid”, in Skopje, for the subjects Comparative religion and Social politics and religion. On September 17, 2018, he was elected Doctor honoris causa of the University “St. Cyril and St. Methodius” in Veliko Trnovo, Bulgaria.

Published books

As translator from Russian into Greek 

ΑΓΙΟΣ ΜΑΞΙΜΟΣ Ο ΓΡΑΙΚΟΣ Ο ΦΩΤΙΣΤΗΣ ΤΩΝ ΡΩΣΩΝ (“Venerable Maximus the Greek – The Enlightener of Russia”), ΙΕΡΑ ΜΟΝΗ ΟΣΙΟΥ ΓΡΗΓΟΡΙΟΥ ΑΓΙΟΥ ΟΡΟΥΣ, 1991.

As translator from Greek into Macedonian 

 "From Mask to Person" by Metropolitan John D. Zizioulas of Pergamon (1998)
 "On Spirit and Life" by Elder Sophrony (Sakharov) (1999)
 "Introduction into monastic life" by Elder Paisios the Athonite (1999)
 "Hesychastic Testimonies" (selection) by Elder Joseph Spilaioti (1999)
 "St. Gregory Palamas and the Orthodox Spirituality" by John Meyendorff (2001)
 "Counsels on the Jesus Prayer" by Elder Ephraim of Philotheou (2001)

In the year 2000, he received the award "Archbishop Gabriel" for the most successful translation in spiritual literature for the book "Hesychastic Testimonies", given by the Macedonian Association of Literary Translators. He is an Honorary Member of the Macedonian Writers' Association.

As author 

So far, fifteen of his authorial books have been published, containing pastoral epistles, letters, homilies, interviews and ascetical-hesychastic essays, the titles of which are as follows: 
 "The Orthodox Church and the Union" (1992) 
 "Homily from Eleusa" (2001) 
 "Homily from Vodoča" (2002) 
 "Facing the Absurd" (2007) 
 "Neither Will I Tell You..." (2008) 
 "Hesychasm in Athonite Monasticism of the 20th Century - Mind-and-Heart Prayer within the Harmony of the Ascetical-Hesychastic Struggle" (2009)
 "You Do Not Know What Manner of Spirit You Are of" (2010) 
 "A School of Hesychasm – Primary" (2011) 
 "Fruitful Virginity" (2012) 
 "Only One Thing is Needed" (2013)  
 "Overcoming the Dualism" (2014) 
 "Passover from Soulfulness into Spirituality" (2015) 
 "New Personal Relationships" (2016)
 "Pastoral Approach or Identification" (2017)
 "Christian Identity" (2018)

Two of his books, "Neither Will I Tell You..." and "Only One Thing is Needed" are translated in English and available on Amazon as kindle editions (e-books).

The book "Neither Will I Tell You..." (2015) has been published in Romanian, and the books "Neither Will I Tell You..." and "Overcoming the Dualism" (2018) are published in Bulgarian language.

International Scientific Conferences 

 Scientific Conference dedicated to the 2000th anniversary of Christianity: "Christianity in the Culture and Arts of the Strumica Diocese", Monastery Vodoča, Strumica, August 2008,  introduction speech Homily in Vodoča;
 Scientific Conference "Skopje between Antique and Modern Times", traditional cultural-historic manifestation "Days Dedicated to the Holy Emperor Justinian I", Skopje, May 11–13, 2006,  The Role of the Emperor Justinian I in the Continuity of the Organized Church Life in Macedonia;
 IV Macedonian Psychiatric Congress and International Meeting, Ohrid, May 27–31, 2009, Basics of the Orthodox Psychotherapy;
 International Symposium "Trialogue between the Abrahamite Religions: Judaism – Christianity – Islam (Rediscovery of Traditions and Values)", Sofia, Bulgaria, November 13–15, 2009, Role and Functions of the Religious Leader in the Orthodox Church;
 International Scientific Conference "The 1100th Anniversary of the Dormition of Saint Nahum of Ohrid", Macedonian Orthodox Church – Ohrid Archbishopric, Ohrid, October 3–5, 2010, Enlightenments on the Inner Spiritual Life of Saint Naum;
 International Scientific Conference "Saint Nahum of Ohrid in the Slavic, Spiritual, Cultural and Scriptural Tradition", The Ss. Cyril and Methodius University – Skopje, Ohrid, November 4–7, 2010, Saint Nahum of Ohrid and the Fundamental Continuity of the Christian Tradition;
 "Contributions" (Official Journal of the Macedonian Academy of Sciences and Arts), Basics of the Ascetical (Christian) Psychotherapy, Macedonian Academy of Sciences and Arts, Section of Medical Sciences, ISSN 1857-9345, XXXVI 1, Skopje, 2015, pp. 165–173;
 4th PAR International Leadership Conference: “Change Leadership: Key to Successful Growth”, Opatija, Croatia, March 13–14, 2015, Spiritual Crisis of Leadership;
 2nd International Conference “On the soul”, The Association of Comparative Literature of Macedonia ZKKM, The Association of Classical Philologists “Antika” and The Philosophical Society of Macedonia, June 1–3, 2016, Skopje, The Orthodox Aspect of the Soul, with Particular Focus on the Distinction between the Mind and the Intellect, pp. 189–200;
 DGPPN Congress, Berlin, 2016, “Psyche – Mensch – Gesellschaft”, November 23–26, 2016, CityCube Berlin, Basics of Christian Psychotherapy – Integration of Psychology and Spirituality in the Psychotherapy;
 DGPPN Congress, Berlin, 2016, “Psyche – Mensch – Gesellschaft”, November 23–26, 2016, CityCube Berlin, Therapeutic Community POKROV – Integrative Concept in the Treatment of Addictions and Hazard;
 9th International Scientific Conference “International Dialogue: East-West”, The International Slavic University “G. R. Derzhavin” – Sveti Nikole, Republic of North Macedonia, April 20–21, 2018, Psychological Hunger, Consumerism and Mass Introjection: Two Models of Life, pp. 209–212;
 6th Macedonian Psychiatric Congress and International Meeting “Psychiatry and Mental Health in 21st Century”, Ohrid, Republic of North Macedonia, 31 October – 3 November 2018, The Impact of the Spiritual Life on the Process of Grieving and Bereavement;
 6th Macedonian Psychiatric Congress and International Meeting “Psychiatry and Mental Health in 21st Century”, Ohrid, Republic of North Macedonia, 31 October – 3 November 2018, The Fourth Dimension of Health — Spiritual Health in Clinical Practice;
 DGPPN Congress, Berlin, 2018, "FOCUSING ON THE FUTURE", 28 November–1 December 2018, CityCube Berlin, The Correlation between the Level of Spiritual Development and Mental Health;
 19th WPA World Congress of Psychiatry, Lisbon, Portugal, August 21–24, 2019, The Psychological State of Family Members in the Grieving Process, https://doi.org/10.26226/morressier.5d1a035e57558b317a13f7bc
 19th WPA World Congress of Psychiatry, Lisbon, Portugal, August 21–24, 2019, Spirituality in Psychotherapy, https://doi.org/10.26226/morressier.5d1a037757558b317a1407b8

External links
 Official website of the Macedonian Orthodox Church - Ohrid Archbishopric

1961 births
Living people
Members of the Macedonian Orthodox Church
Eastern Orthodox metropolitans